was a renowned Japanese photographer, active in the 1930s.

References

Japanese photographers
Year of birth unknown
Year of death unknown